The U-League (Korean: 대학농구 U-리그 or 한국대학농구리그) is the main college basketball competition in South Korea. It is sanctioned by the Korea University Basketball Federation (KUBF; Korean: 한국대학농구연맹), which oversees college basketball in South Korea, and the Korea University Sports Federation (KUSF).

Teams
The following universities and colleges are members of the Korea University Basketball Federation:

Men

 Division 1
Chosun University (Gwangju)
Chung-Ang University (Seoul)
Dankook University (Seoul)
Dongguk University (Seoul)
Hanyang University (Seoul)
Konkuk University (Seoul)
Korea University (Seoul)
Kyung Hee University (Seoul)
Myongji University (Seoul)
Sangmyung University (Seoul)
Sungkyunkwan University (Seoul)
Yonsei University (Seoul)

 Division 2
Busan Arts College (Busan)
Chodang University (Muan County, South Jeolla Province)
Chosun College of Science and Technology (Gwangju)
Korea Golf University (Hoengseong County, Gangwon Province)
Mokpo National University (Mokpo)
Sejong University (Seoul)
Seoul National University (Seoul)
Woosuk University (Wanju County, North Jeolla Province)
University of Ulsan (Ulsan)

Women
Dankook University (Seoul)
Gwangju University (Gwangju)
Pusan National University (Busan)
University of Suwon (Suwon)
University of Ulsan (Ulsan)
Vision College of Jeonju (Jeonju)

Competition
The teams compete in a league/play-offs format with teams designated "home" or "away", mirroring the professional KBL and WKBL. Players who are registered with a team are eligible to participate in the rookie draft if they decide to become professional basketball players.

For the men's competition, only KUBF Division 1 members participate in the KUSF U-League. The U-League is considered to be the elite competition and a stepping stone to the KBL as a majority of the players from Division 1 teams will declare for the KBL rookie draft. Teams from Division 2 member institutions participate in the KUSF Club Championship. Both Division 1 and Division 2 teams also participate in the older MBC Cup competition organized by the KUBF.

The women's teams participate in the KUSF U-League. They also compete in the MBC Cup, along with club teams (non U-League members).

Results

Men

Due to the COVID-19 pandemic, the full season was not played between 2020 and the first half of 2022.

Women

History
The Basketball U-League was founded in 2010 (men's competition) and 2015 (women's competition) as part of the Korea University Sports Federation's effort to organize college sports into a more streamlined format similar to the National Collegiate Athletic Association in the United States. The U-League system also includes five other sports. 

The Korea University Basketball Federation has existed since 1964 and college teams competed in the Korean Basketball Association-sanctioned National Basketball Festival (Korean: 농구대잔치). At that time, basketball was still an amateur sport and teams were all sponsored by corporate companies or universities. When the professional league (Korean Basketball League) was founded in 1997, the senior teams all became professional teams, leaving only the Korea Armed Forces Athletic Corps's Sangmu basketball team and college teams to compete in the tournament. With the founding of the U-League, a large number of college teams opt not to send their teams to the National Basketball Festival or only send their freshmen.

Notes

References

External Links
Korea University Basketball Federation (KUBF) Official  Website 

U-League
University and college basketball in South Korea